Thichoor is a village in Thrissur district some  north of Thrissur town.

References

Villages in Thrissur district